Snabba Cash is a 2021 Swedish streaming television series written by Jens Lapidus and Oskar Söderlund (screenwriter) and directed by . It is based on Lapidus' Stockholm Noir novel trilogy, the first of which was adapted into three films: Easy Money (2010), Easy Money II: Hard to Kill (2012), and Easy Money III: Life Deluxe (2013). The series takes place in Stockholm, ten years after the film trilogy.

In June 2021, a second season was announced and was released in September 2022.

Cast 
 Evin Ahmad as Leya
 Alexander Abdallah as Salim
 Ayaan Ahmed as Nala
 Ali Alarik as Tim
 Dada Fungula Bozela as Ravy
 Olle Sarri as Thomas Storm
 Nadja Christiansson as Ronja
 Egon Ebbersten as Martin Wallin
 Peter Eggers as Marcus Werner
 Love Ehn as Leon
 Jozef Wojciechowicz as Dani 
 Alex Moore Eklund as Barre
 Yussra El Abdouni as Fatima
 Fredrik Evers as Tim's Father
 Yasmine Garbi as Li
 Khalil Ghazal as Osman
 Felice Jankell as Viktoria

Episodes  

Episodes for Seasons 1 and 2

References

External links
 
 

2020s crime drama television series
2021 Swedish television series debuts
Swedish crime television series
Swedish drama television series
Swedish-language Netflix original programming
Television series about organized crime
Television shows based on Swedish novels
Television shows filmed in Sweden
Television shows set in Stockholm
Works about organized crime in Sweden